The  Azuchi Screens  are a set of six-folding screens depicting Azuchi Castle and its nearby town. Oda Nobunaga gifted them to Pope Gregory XIII, who displayed them in the Vatican collections, where they were admired by visitors. However, they disappeared from historical record. Their fate is unknown and they are considered to be lost. The screens must have been pivotal works in the development of Japanese folding screens.

Variations on the name are Azuchiyama screens or Azuchi Castle screens.

History
The second half and the start of the seventeenth century saw the unification of Japan through the conquests of three great military leaders: Oda Nobunaga, Toyotomi Hideyoshi, and Tokugawa Ieyasu. This era is also called the Azuchi-Momoyama period, after the sites of the great castles of Nobunaga and Hideyoshi. The period saw a rapid development in Japanese castle construction: castles on a larger grander scale boasting a large stone basis, a complex arrangement of concentric baileys, and a tall tower. But also, in the visual arts, such as the folding screens decorating the palatial residences.

In 1579, Oda Nobunaga commissioned Kanō Eitoku (1543-1590), the most famous Japanese painter of his time, to create a pair of folding screens of Azuchi castle. It was a meticulously detailed birds-eye view of the fortress and its nearby town. In 1581, the Italian Jesuit Alessandro Valignano (1539 – 1606) visited Japan. Oda Nobunaga gifted him with the screens. The Jesuit conceived the idea of sending a Japanese embassy to Europe, and the screens became part of this plan. This became the so-called Tenshō embassy of 1582–1592, consisting of four young Japanese noblemen who left Japan to visit the Pope and the kings of Europe. Over India, Portugal and Spain, they traveled to Italy. In March 1585, the embassy arrived in Rome. In the afternoon of 3 April 1585, in the Papal apartments of the Vatican, they presented the screens to Pope Gregory XIII (1502-1585). Afterwards, they are set up for display in a gallery of the Vatican, probably the Galleria delle carte geografiche ('Gallery of Maps').

In 1592, a Flemish artist from Leuven named Philips van Winghe made a few drawings copying details of Azuchi castle. This is the last historical record of the screens. They were major renovations of the gallery between 1592 and 1596, and between 1630 and 1637, but there is no record what happened to the screens.

There is a faint hope that the screens will be discovered in a forgotten corner of the Vatican. It is also possible that a Pope has re-gifted them to some one else, and that they are hidden in a repository elsewhere in Europe. In the early 2000s, during a restoration of Eggenberg Palace in Graz, Austria screens were discovered depicting Toyotomi's Osaka Castle. In the 18th century, they were repurposed to decorate a room of the palace. Something similar may have  happened to the Azuchi screens. However, a scholar raised that compared to Japan the climate is comparatively dryer in Italy, which may have caused the screens to disintegrate, which is also a possibility.

The sketches by Philips van Winghe are also lost. However, the Italian Filippo Ferroverde made two woodblock print copies for Lorenzo Pignoria’s (1571-1631) addendum, Second Part of the Images of Indian Gods, in the 1624, 1626, and 1647 editions of Vincent Catari’s (circa 1531-1569) Images of the Gods and Ancients. These prints are still there and often discussed in studies on the Azuchi castle.

Most likely, the Tenshō embassy also presented folding screens to the king of Spain in the court of Madrid, but they left no trace here at all.

Azuchi Screens Research Network
In 1984, the town of Azuchi conducts the first research project into the screens at the Vatican, but no information is found. Multiple investigation attempts are performed by a group of scholars and government officials in the period between 2004 and 2016. In 2016, this resulted in the creation of the Azuchi Screens Research Network, a group dedicated ‘to finding these priceless artworks, or in lieu of the real thing, discovering vestiges, descriptions, or other mentions of the screens that might offer new insights into the screens’ composition, character, quality, meanings, or fate’. The network sponsors two part-time researchers in Rome.

References

Literature

External links
 
 

Folding screens
Holy See–Japan relations
Kanō school
Lost paintings